Crosby Township is one of the twelve townships of Hamilton County, Ohio, United States.  The 2020 census found 6,030 people in the township.

Geography
Located in the northwestern part of the county, it borders the following townships:
Ross Township, Butler County - northeast
Colerain Township - east
Whitewater Township - south
Harrison Township - west
Morgan Township, Butler County - northwest

One municipality, Harrison, while located primarily in Harrison Township, extends eastward into Crosby Township.

The township's total area is 20 sq mi (52 km). The terrain rises in a series of hills from the Great Miami River in the southeast and the becomes more regular in the north and west.  As of 1990, only 9% of the township's land had been developed for suburban use, while 60% was agricultural and 27% remained wooded.  Most of the extensive County Park, Miami Whitewater Forest, is located in Crosby Township.

The township retains much of its original area and rural character.

Settlements
While there are no formally organized villages in the township, there have been three settlements: New Baltimore, New Haven, and Whitewater Shaker Village.

In July 1863, Morgan's Raiders used a ford at New Baltimore to cross the Miami River.

New Haven was platted as a village by Joab Comstock in 1815. In the 19th century the village had a post office, but was known as "Preston". This was necessary since there was already a New Haven in Huron County, Ohio, and the name was assigned by the first postmaster, Alexander Preston Cavender.

In 1824 settlement was accelerated by the founding of Whitewater Shaker Village as a commune of the Shakers, the organization's fourth and last village in Ohio. Today the village's Shaker Cemetery is maintained by the township trustees and is open to the public; while most of the settlement's buildings remain along Oxford Road, they are all privately owned.

Name
Named for Joab Comstock's mother Thankful Crosby, it is the only Crosby Township statewide. Willey road however, may have been named for Joab's wife Eunice Willey.

History

The lands in Crosby Township were opened later and more slowly than its southern neighbors.  While good land remained for sale in the more accessible townships there was little incentive to move this far away from the Ohio River.  Difficulties with local Indians contributed to this delay.

Joab Comstock was the first settler. He came from New Haven, Connecticut in 1801 and purchased several sections leading up from the banks of the Great Miami River.  The township was organized in 1803.

A singular element of Crosby Township's role in history is related to the pacifist beliefs of the Shakers and some of their neighbors.  During the Civil War, a subscription fund was raised and held by the township clerk, with the funds used to pay a bounty to a volunteer to replace any drafted subscriber.  When the war and the draft ended in 1865, the remaining $1,200 was used to erect the frame building that has served as the Crosby Township Hall ever since.

Government
The township is governed by a three-member board of trustees, who are elected in November of odd-numbered years to a four-year term beginning on the following January 1. Two are elected in the year after the presidential election and one is elected in the year before it. There is also an elected township fiscal officer, who serves a four-year term beginning on April 1 of the year after the election, which is held in November of the year before the presidential election. Vacancies in the fiscal officership or on the board of trustees are filled by the remaining trustees.

Fernald
A major issue in the township is the ongoing activity related to the clean-up of the Fernald plant site, which was built during World War II and was used to refine uranium isotopes needed for the first atom bomb.

References

External links

Township website

Townships in Hamilton County, Ohio
1803 establishments in Ohio
Populated places established in 1803
Townships in Ohio